Kalateh-ye Boluch (also Romanized as Kalāteh-ye Bolūch and Kalāteh Balūch; also known as Kalāt-e Balūch) is a village in Doreh Rural District, in the Central District of Sarbisheh County, South Khorasan Province, Iran. At the 2006 census, its population was 127, in 24 families.

References 

Populated places in Sarbisheh County